There are at least 34 named lakes and reservoirs in Garfield County, Montana.

Lakes

Reservoirs
 Antone Reservoir, el. 
 Birkrem Reservoir, el. 
 Buffalo Hill Reservoir, el. 
 Burgess Reservoir, el. 
 Cedar Bed Ground Reservoir, el. 
 Christenson Reservoir, el. 
 Clear Water Reservoir, el. 
 Cottonwood Reservoir, el. 
 Cottonwood Tree Lakes, el. 
 Ezekial Reservoir, el. 
 Ezwkial Number One Reservoir, el. 
 Fisher Reservoir, el. 
 Fork Reservoir, el. 
 Fourteen Reservoir, el. 
 Guesanborn Reservoir, el. 
 Gumbo Reservoir, el. 
 Jade Reservoir, el. 
 Krieder Reservoir, el. 
 Mashesky Reservoir, el. 
 McKrone Reservoir, el. 
 McWilliams Reservoir, el. 
 Mud Lake, el. 
 Mullory Reservoir, el. 
 Murnions Reservoir, el. 
 Old Lake, el. 
 Section Four Reservoir, el. 
 Shaw Reservoir, el. 
 Split Reservoir, el. 
 Steel Mule Reservoir, el. 
 Stroud Reservoir, el. 
 Ten Reservoir, el. 
 Thomas Reservoir, el. 
 Wheatcroft Reservoir, el. 
 York Reservoir, el.

See also
 List of lakes in Montana

Notes

Bodies of water of Garfield County, Montana
Garfield